The Partridge River and its tributary the Little Partridge River are small rivers in rural west-central Minnesota in the United States.  The Partridge is a  tributary of the Crow Wing River, via which it is part of the Mississippi River watershed.

Course
The Partridge River rises in Bertha Township north of the town of Eagle Bend on The Harren Farm in northwestern Todd County and flows generally northeastwardly into southeastern Wadena County, past the town of Aldrich.

Its largest tributary is the Little Partridge River, which rises west of Eagle Bend in Wykeham Township in Todd County and flows  northeastwardly, parallel to the uppermost stretch of the Partridge River, which it joins in Bartlett Township.

See also
List of rivers of Minnesota

References

Rivers of Minnesota
Rivers of Todd County, Minnesota
Rivers of Wadena County, Minnesota
Tributaries of the Mississippi River